Dori (also known as Winde or Wendu) is a town in northeastern Burkina Faso, near the border of Niger. It is the capital of Sahel Region and has a population of 46,512 (2019). The main ethnic group is the Fula (Fulani) but Tuaregs, Songhai, and Hausa people are often present. It is a town known for its herders and popular livestock markets.

Mines 
In 2004, a proposal surfaced to link the manganese mines by rail with the seaports of Ghana.

Notable people 

 Roukiatou Maiga, humanitarian
 Albert Ouédraogo, former Burkinabé Prime Minister

See also 
 Railway stations in Burkina Faso

Gallery

References

External links 

Populated places in the Sahel Region